The Fall of Angkor, also known as the Sack of Angkor or Siege of Angkor was a seven-month siege by the Ayutthaya Kingdom on the Khmer capital of Angkor. After the Khmer refused to recognize Thai authority, the Thai besieged Angkor and sacked the capital city. The Khmer King Ponhea Yat fled the city to Basan and later to Chaktomuk (in present-day Phnom Penh).
Though the Khmer Empire was already in decline, the conquest of Angkor delivered the final blow and the empire fell. 
Angkor was subsequently abandoned. 
After the Fall of Angkor, the King moved the capital first to Basan and later to Chaktomuk, initiating the period known as the Post-Angkor Period.

History

First invasion of 1353 
Invasions from Siam began in 1353 when, according to the Non Chronicles, Ramathibodi I seized Angkor. A Khmer prince retook Angkor in 1358.

Second invasion in 1370 
The Siamese besieged Angkor Wat once more in 1370. Wolters suggests that at that time the Khmer court moved to Asan, before returning to Angkor a few year later.

Third invasion and fall of Angkor in 1431 
In 1431, the Siamese captured the capital of Angkor after a third invasion. Ayutthaya established a governorship in Angkor for a short period and then abandoned it.

Factors 
There continues to be some debate over the fall of Angkor. The fall of Angkor has been attributed to a variety of factors, of both human and natural origin.

Human factors

Military defeat 
The main reason for the fall of Angkor, especially according to Thai historians, the Siamese attack in 1431 which caused the Khmer to abandon Angkor and to retreat south-eastwards.

Some believe that Champa warriors from Southeast Asia may have sacked the city for its wealth.

A collapse of the hydraulic city 
Command of water played an important role in the rise and fall of Angkor, and scholars using satellite technology are only now beginning to fathom the true size and achievement of medieval Khmer society. Once abandoned after the reign of Suryavarman II, stagnating reservoirs attracting mosquitoes may have been the cause spreading malaria as this was also the period in which this disease was introduced in Southeast Asia.

Groslier argues the fall of Angkor was partly brought on by an imbalance in the ecosystem that was caused by the extension of irrigated rice fields and hydraulic cities into formerly forested land in Cambodia, and was therefore an ecological crisis induced by mankind.

A more Malthusian argument that with excessive population growth, Angkor was unable to feed its own population which led to social unrest and eventually societal collapse.

A crisis of faith 
Some scholars have connected the decline of Angkor with the conversion of the Khmer Empire to Theravada Buddhism following the reign of Jayavarman VII, arguing that this religious transition eroded the Hindu concept of kingship that underpinned the Angkorian civilization. According to Angkor scholar George Coedès, Theravada Buddhism's denial of the ultimate reality of the individual served to sap the vitality of the royal personality cult which had provided the inspiration for the grand monuments of Angkor. The vast expanse of temples required an equally large body of workers to maintain them; at Ta Prohm, a stone carving states that 12,640 people serviced that single temple complex. Not only could the spread of Buddhism have eroded this workforce, but it could have also affected the estimated 300,000 agricultural workers required to feed them all.

On the other hand, a new religious fervor was growing among the Siamese who came to believe that they had the moral authority as well as the self-confidence and the public support to challenge Khmer rule as the moral order of Angkor declined.

Natural factors

Southeast Asian drought of the early 1400s 
Southeast Asia suffered a severe drought in the early 1400s. The East Asian summer monsoon became very fickle in the decades leading up to the fall of Angkor in the fifteenth century. Brendan Buckley suggests this drought dried out Angkor's reservoirs and canals, which in turn, led to its precipitous decline and foreign invasion.

Climate change 
Climate change may have been another factor in the fall of Angkor which happened during the transition from the Medieval Warm Period to the Little Ice Age. The fall of Angkor was an "impressive illustration for failure to interact successfully with hydrological extremes".

Aftermath

Angkor fallen, but not abandoned 
Contrary to the popular idea that ancient temple complexes had been abandoned after the fall of Angkor, many important sites remained in use, although now they were rededicated to the Theravada cult. After the fall of Angkor in the fifteenth century and the permanent removal of the capital to the south, Khmer royalty repeatedly returned to Angkor's temples, paying their respects to gods and ancestors, restoring old statues and erecting new ones, as can be seen from the Grande Inscription d'Angkor and even to this day, with "unflagging assiduity".

Moving out of Angkor into the Middle Period 
After the fall of Angkor, Cambodian history can be characterized as a declining state because of the limited information.

A literary downfall 
Because of Cambodia's troubles following the fall of Angkor, no Cambodian literature survives that can be precisely dated to the 15th or 16th centuries. The earliest written extant literature consists of the Reamker (Cambodian Rāmayāna), and Chbab (Codes of Conduct). Many Khmer writers and books were relocated to Siam. While it had been the main language in Khmer inscriptions, Sanskrit was abandoned and replaced by Middle Khmer, showing borrowings from Thai, Lao and to a lesser extent, Vietnamese.

References

External links 
 History of Angkor (in a nutshell)

Khmer Empire
Ayutthaya Kingdom
Conflicts in 1431
Societal collapse